The Tabriz Southern Freeway is located in the southern part of Tabriz and is part of Freeway 2. There are plans to connect the freeway west towards Turkey.

Freeways in Iran
Transport in Tabriz